Caucasorhynchia is an extinct genus of brachiopods in the family Allorhynchidae. Species are known from the Triassic of Europe, Russia and the United States.

See also 
 List of brachiopod genera

References

External links 

 
 

Prehistoric brachiopod genera
Triassic brachiopods
Rhynchonellida
Prehistoric brachiopods of North America